Generator Rex is an American animated science fiction television series created by Man of Action for Cartoon Network, with John Fang of Cartoon Network Studios serving as supervising director. It was inspired by the comic M. Rex, created by Aaron Sowd, Joe Kelly and Duncan Rouleau, and published by Image Comics in 1999. The series premiered in the United States on April 23, 2010 on Cartoon Network, and concluded on January 3, 2013. 

A two-part crossover special with Ben 10: Ultimate Alien, titled Ben 10/Generator Rex: Heroes United, aired on November 25, 2011, while a second 44-minute four-part special, Ben Gen 10, aired on April 11, 2021, featuring new younger versions of the Generator Rex characters in the Ben 10 reboot universe.

Plot

Seasons 1–2 (2010–2011)
Rex is a cocky fifteen-year-old amnesiac teenager who is a permanent E.V.O. Unlike most E.V.O.s, he lacks any physical deformation but has forgotten his past. He is also able to control his active nanites, allowing him to manifest from his body a wide variety of various bio-mechanical abilities and powers. Rex has the unique ability to deactivate nanites inside other E.V.O.s, effectively curing them of their monstrous mutations and returning them to normal. Working for Providence under Agent Six, and White Knight, Rex uses his unique abilities to stop and cure rampant E.V.O.s. 

His archenemy, Van Kleiss, is a British scientist, earth-manipulating humanoid E.V.O. who despises Providence and is connected to the original nanite explosion (which is noted as "the Nanite Event" five years prior). His ultimate goal is to be all-powerful, using fellow E.V.O.s to get him there, he promises to tell Rex all about his childhood past if he will join him, using the former's blooming relationship with siren-like human E.V.O. Circe to do so. Once attaining Rex's nanites, Van Kleiss acquires the opposing ability to create E.V.O.s upon physical contact; whereas Rex fully regains his powers and access to new and even greater machinery from his Omega-1 Nanite once fully tapping into said nanite's greater technological abilities.

After her second and final mission with the Pack, Circe eventually defects when Van Kleiss allows Rex's life to be threatened and joins his .E.V.O. street gang in Hong Kong, China. To further complicate matters, Rex's long-lost elder brother Dr. Cesar Salazar suddenly resurfaces and joins Providence. At one point, Van Kleiss and Rex are forced to work together to escape the artificial intelligence Zag-RS who is, in truth, a creation of Caesar's who had modeled her voice after that of their late Mexican mother Violetta. Back in Hong Kong, Rex encounters and beats his former boss Quarry who was given a proposition from Van Kleiss, but was taken to Abysus for punishment for double-crossing him. Rex's ninja-like partner Six suffers amnesia of his own from a machine of Cesar's invention but chooses not to regain them. In last ditch effort to achieve his ultimate aim of becoming a god, Van Kleiss has further developed Breach's portal-creating ability to the point that she can travel through time itself. As a direct result of Breach's greater abilities, Rex is sent six months into the future and Van Kleiss is sent to the ancient past, revealing that everything has changed drastically since Rex's "disappearance" and is shocked upon meeting a woman now in charge of Providence calling herself "Black Knight."

Season Three (2011–2013)
Rex is eventually thrown into six months the not-too-distant future by Breach's newfound time-traveling portal, in which everything has changed since his "six-month disappearance" and that Providence has been taken over by a woman called Black Knight, who attempts to manipulate Rex into utilizing him and his ever-developing and evolving abilities for her side in "saving" humanity by restarting the Nanite Project with those who had funded it six years ago in order to become all-powerful by ensuring the creation of five certain meta/master-control nanities that contain the almighty and infinitely limitless "God Code." The first four were scattered all across the planet due to the Nanite Event, and the fifth and most powerful one has been kept hidden undetected deep within Rex himself due to his elder brother and their late Hispanic scientist parents, Rafael and Violetta Salazar, had secretly programmed them to fully work for Rex alone.

Once becoming one with the God Code, Rex utilizes his newly attained godhood to successfully cure all animal and human E.V.O.s in one single shot, afterwards he is reunited with his now-normal good friends- Tuck, Cricket and Sqywdd- and girlfriend Circe, and forgives Cesar for his past ambiguous actions. Van Kleiss, who is revealed to have been responsible for Rafael and Violetta's deaths by trapping inside as the nanite reactor exploded, is taken to Breach's pocket dimension of Greenville, Ohio.

Characters

Main characters
 Daryl Sabara as Rex Salazar, Rombauer (1st time), White Fighter, East Side kid
 Wally Kurth as Agent Six, Captain Calan, Maxwell, Systems Op
 John DiMaggio as Bobo Haha, Skalamander, Architect, Jungle Cat, Pete Volkov, Robo Bobo Haha, Michael, Hunter Cain (2nd time), Dark figure, Rath, Providence Agent (1st time), Huckster, Vostok, Pyreptryx, Nyquist, Biruta, Umpire, Infected 2, Human EVO, Lunk, Waiter (1st time), Payson, Bug, DJ, Older Providence worker, Dock Worker, Guard 1, Providence Tech (2nd time), Villager, Providence Soldier 1 (2nd time), Black Pawn
 Grey DeLisle as Rebecca Holiday, ZAG-RS, Little Girl (Slug EVO), Woman (Rock & Mud EVO), Female Co-pilot, Doctor Rhodes, Diane Farrah, Isabella, Violeta Salazar, Little Spanish boy, Reporter, Kate, Larvus, Wade, Waitress, House wife, Trig Student 2, Beach Girl 1, Echoey Voice 2, Computer, Innocent girl, News Reporter, Librarian, Lady
 J.K. Simmons as White Knight, Cured E.V.O., Waiter (2nd time), Control Voice
 Fred Savage as Noah Nixon, Beagle (1st time), Waylan, Infected 1, Sit-Ops Tech, Team leader
 Troy Baker as Van Kleiss, Biowulf, Agent Weaver, Roswell, Captured zombie, Businessman, Etude, Echoey Voice 1, United Nations Official, Providence Tech (2nd time), Guard, Male Party-Goer, Providence Soldier 1 (1st time)

Recurring characters

Episodes

Generator Rex currently does not air on Cartoon Network. Episodes 56 through 60 were released on iTunes for purchase before they aired. The show "ended" with its third season, but had left out many important things unresolved before the two-part season three finale "Endgame";  namely Rex and Circe's romantic relationship that finally blossomed at the end of Episode 51 "Assault on Abysus"  and with Rex rescuing her from Providence ("Mind Games") some time before the two-part finale.

Crossovers

On July 11, 2011, the schedule for the 2011 San Diego Comic-Con revealed that during Cartoon Network's panel, a crossover special between the Ben 10: Ultimate Alien and Generator Rex series titled Ben 10/Generator Rex: Heroes United would be discussed. During the conference, show creators "Man of Action" revealed that the crossover would be a special, extended episode of Generator Rex, which aired on November 25, 2011 on Cartoon Network. The double-length special revolved around Ben and Rex fighting a villain, originally created by Rex's older brother Caesar, the Alpha Nanite. Rex makes a cameo appearance in the OK K.O.! Let's Be Heroes episode, Crossover Nexus along with many other Cartoon Network shows. On February 17, 2021, it was announced Generator Rex would have a 44-minute crossover special with Ben 10 (2016–21), which aired on April 11, 2021.

Other media

Home video
Warner Home Video released Volume 1 DVD, a two-disc set that contains the first nine episodes of the series on October 19, 2010.

Video game
A video game, entitled Generator Rex: Agent of Providence, has been developed for Wii, PlayStation 3, Nintendo DS, Nintendo 3DS and Xbox 360. The game was released on November 1, 2011 in the United States, published by Activision. The plot involves Van Kleiss attempting to find blueprints to build an Omega-One Nanite. The entire voice cast reprises their roles from the series. Agent of Providence was given an E10+ rating by ESRB. The game was also scored by the series' composer, Kevin Manthei.

Toy line
Mattel has produced a toy line based on the series. For the main figures each is approximately 4 inches tall and packaged with an ordinary day E.V.O. There were also deluxe figures, EVO attack packs, as well as other waves and lines that were never released including a line from MEGA Bloks was announced (in 2010) featuring construction sets.

Publications
Cartoon Network has featured Generator Rex and Ben 10  in their and DC Comicss Cartoon Network: Action Pack comic books. Two 3D picture books (featuring cardboard 3D glasses) "EVOs and Heroes," a whole analysis on characters and their abilities and "The Swarm," an adaption of the episode of the same name, where Rex must fight insect E.V.O.s that feed on metal, have also been released. For beginning readers, the story "Leader of the Pack" is also based on an episode and features Rex and Bobo being captured and locked in an underground prison cell.

In February 2013, IDW Publishing announced a partnership with Cartoon Network to produce comic books and issues based on its properties. Generator Rex along with Ben 10 was one of the titles announced to be published.

Awards

See also
 M. Rex

References

External links

 

Generator Rex
Ben 10
Man of Action Studios
2010 American television series debuts
2013 American television series endings
2010s American animated television series
2010s American science fiction television series
American children's animated action television series
American children's animated adventure television series
American children's animated science fantasy television series
American children's animated superhero television series
Cyborg superheroes
Anime-influenced Western animated television series
Cartoon Network original programming
Television series by Cartoon Network Studios
Cartoon Network Studios superheroes
Child superheroes
English-language television shows
Mattel
Nanopunk
Teen animated television series
Teen superhero television series
Television series based on Image Comics
Television shows based on comics
Works by Joe Kelly (comics writer)